The West Himalayish languages, also known as Almora and Kanauric, are a family of Sino-Tibetan languages centered in Himachal Pradesh, Uttarakhand and across the border into Nepal. LaPolla (2003)  proposes that the West Himalayish languages may be part of a larger "Rung" group.

Languages
The languages include:
Kinnauri
Chitkuli Kinnauri
Kinnauri
Thebor: Sunam, Jangshung, Shumcho
Lahaulic: Pattani (Manchad), Tinan
Gahri (Bunan)
Kanashi
Rongpo–Almora
Rongpo
Almora (Ranglo): Darmiya, Byangsi, Dhuleli, Chaudangsi, Rangas (extinct early 20th century), Zhangzhung

Zhangzhung, the sacred language of the Bon religion, was spoken north of the Himalayas across western Tibet before being replaced by Tibetan. James Matisoff (2001) provides lexical and phonological evidence for the classification of Zhangzhung within West Himalayish.

Classification
Widmer (2014:47) classifies the West Himalayish languages as follows. The recently discovered Dhuleli language has been added from Regmi & Prasain (2017).
West Himalayish
Western
Lahaul: Manchad, Tinan
Kinnaur: Kanashi, Lower Kinnauri, Standard Kinnauri, Chitkhuli, Jangrami, Shumcho
Eastern
Central: Bunan, Sunnami, Rongpo; possibly Zhangzhung
Almora: Rangas, Darmiya, Byangsi, Dhuleli, Chaudangsi

Widmer (2014:53–56) classifies Zhangzhung within the Eastern branch of West Himalayish, and notes that it appears particularly close to languages of the Central subgroup (Bunan, Sunnami, and Rongpo).

Widmer (2017) notes that many Tibetan varieties in the western Tibetan Plateau have been influenced by West Himalayish languages.

Vocabulary
Widmer (2017) lists the following lexical items that differ in the Eastern and Western branches of West Himalayish.

Widmer (2014:53-56) classifies Zhangzhung within the eastern branch of West Himalayish, and lists the following cognates between Zhangzhung and Proto-West Himalayish.

Footnotes

References
 George van Driem (2001) Languages of the Himalayas: An Ethnolinguistic Handbook of the Greater Himalayan Region. Brill.
LaPolla, Randy. 2001. The Tibeto-Burman Languages of Uttar Pradesh.
Widmer, Manuel. 2017. The linguistic prehistory of the western Himalayas: endangered minority languages as a window to the past. Presented at Panel on Endangered Languages and Historical Linguistics, 23rd International Conference on Historical Linguistics (ICHL 23), San Antonio, Texas.
Widmer, Manuel. 2018. The linguistic prehistory of the western Himalayas. Proceedings of the 51st International Conference on Sino-Tibetan Languages and Linguistics (2018). Kyoto: Kyoto University.